Diane Marie Russell (born August 9, 1976) is an American politician who served in the Maine House of Representatives. She is a member of the Democratic Party.

Political career
When Russell first ran for the State House in 2008, she was working as a cashier at a local convenience store. She served on the Veterans and Legal Affairs Committee and the Energy, Utilities and Technology Committee.

In 2011, The Nation magazine named her "Most Valuable State Representative" on its annual Progressive Honor Roll.

In 2011, Russell introduced a bill to legalize marijuana in Maine. The bill, LD 1453, was voted down in committee (3-8) in March and down by the House of Representatives in June. After being re-elected in 2012, Russell introduced a similar bill to legalize marijuana in 2013. It was co-sponsored by Republican Rep. Aaron Libby.

In November 2012, Russell unsuccessfully sought the Speaker of the Maine House of Representatives position, losing in a Democratic Party caucus vote to Mark Eves of York County.

In 2016, Russell, who was barred by Maine's term limits law from running again for a House seat, ran for a seat in the Maine Senate, and lost in the Democratic primary election, coming in third among the three candidates.

On August 10, 2017, Russell announced her campaign for Governor of Maine in the 2018 race. She finished sixth of seven candidates on the ballot with 2.2%.

Personal life
Russell is a native of Woodstock, Maine, and is a graduate of Leavitt Area High School. She received a B.A. in media studies from the University of Southern Maine. She has also worked as a public relations consultant.

References

External links
Maine House of Representatives bio

1976 births
Living people
American public relations people
Democratic Party members of the Maine House of Representatives
Politicians from Portland, Maine
University of Southern Maine alumni
Women state legislators in Maine
21st-century American politicians
21st-century American women politicians
People from Woodstock, Maine